Ngab or Ngabe is a community in Cameroon, just to the north of Tombel in the Southwest Region, in the country of the Bakossi people.

In 1998 the Ngab-Tombel community received some assistance from Helvetas Cameroon Swiss Association for International Co-operation.

References

Populated places in Cameroon